The Toothbrush Family is an Australian children's animated television series featuring a group of anthropomorphic personal-care supplies. The series was first aired in 1977 until the final episode's airing in 1999.

Concept and production
Originally conceived by Marcia Hatfield of Australia as her son refused to brush his teeth, The stories were written by Marcia Hatfield, the screenplays by Al Guest and Jean Mathieson who produced and directed, creating the series at their Toronto studio Rainbow Animation.

The show later returned for a second series in 1998 (which was later doubled with another animated series Ketchup: Cats Who Cook) and focused on two new characters Molly and Max, along with three other characters, Susie Sponge, Flash Fluoride the toothpaste, and Countess de Comb. The theme song was sung by Kurt Elling.

It was written by John Patterson, produced by Ron Saunders, and directed by Craig Handley and produced by Hanna-Barbera Pty, Ltd. (later Southern Star Productions), Film Australia and Shanghai Animation Film Studio in association with Roymark Television.

Plot
They are commonly remembered from the first series, where they came to life at night when the moon shone into the bathroom.

The main characters in the family were father Tom, mother Tess, the kids Tina and Toby, and Gramps. Also featured were other bathroom items: Flash Fluoride the toothpaste, Hot Rod Harry the electric toothbrush (portrayed as having wheels and a love of speed), Bert Brush, Cecily Comb, Nev Nailbrush, Susie Sponge, Shaggy Dog, Callie Conditioner and Sally Shampoo.

Franchise and merchandise
The Toothbrush Family expanded to include two international television series, DVDs, CDs, videos, audio cassettes, publications, EP and LP record series.

Telecast and home media
In the U.S., the show has been viewed on Captain Kangaroo, ABC Kids, Network Ten (1998 series only) and Nine Network in Australia, Cartoon Network in the United Kingdom and Ireland, TV Tokyo in Japan, YTV in Canada, Italia 1 in Italy, Spacetoon in Indonesia, and Almajd Kids in Saudi Arabia. In the late 1990s, Just for Kids released the show both DVD and video. As of 2022, The show is now streaming on the premium Amazon Prime.

External links
 Official site

References

Australian Broadcasting Corporation original programming
Network 10 original programming
1977 Australian television series debuts
1998 Australian television series debuts
1999 Australian television series endings
1990s Australian animated television series
Australian children's animated television series
Television series by Endemol Australia
Animated television series about families